TER Rhône-Alpes was the regional rail network serving Rhône-Alpes région, eastern France. In 2017 it was merged into the new TER Auvergne-Rhône-Alpes.

TER network

Rail

Road 
Villefranche-sur-Saône – Mâcon TGV
Saint-Claude – Oyonnax – Bellegarde-sur-Valserine
Bellegarde-sur-Valserine – Divonne-les-Bains
Aubenas – Privas – Valence – Valence TGV
Vallon-Pont-d'Arc / Les Vans – Aubenas – Montélimar – Valence TGV
Annonay – Vienne – Lyon

Rolling stock

Multiple units
SNCF Class Z 600
SNCF Class Z 800
SNCF Class Z 850
SNCF Class Z 7100
SNCF Class Z 7500
SNCF Class Z 9500
SNCF Class Z 9600
SNCF Class Z 20500 (temporarily transferred from Île-de-France's RER)
SNCF Class Z 23500
SNCF Class Z 24500
SNCF Class Z 27500
SNCF Class X 2800
SNCF Class X 4630
SNCF Class X 72500
SNCF Class X 73500
SNCF Class B 81500

Locomotives
SNCF Class CC 6500
SNCF Class BB 7200
SNCF Class BB 8500
SNCF Class BB 9600
SNCF Class BB 22200
SNCF Class BB 25150
SNCF Class BB 25200
SNCF Class BB 25500
SNCF Class BB 67300

Statistics 
 2 794 km of lines
 4 735 km of individual railroads
 5 928 bridges, tunnels, etc.
 1 404 level crossings
 534 stations

See also
Transport in Rhône-Alpes
SNCF
Transport express régional
Réseau Ferré de France
List of SNCF stations in Rhône-Alpes
Rhône-Alpes

External links 
TER Rhône-Alpes website
RFF site
Map of the network